BCI may refer to:

Organizations
 Bar Council of India
 Barts Cancer Institute, London, UK
 Bat Conservation International
 Battery Council International, American trade association
 BCI, an investigative law enforcement agency for the U.S. state of Ohio
 BCI Bus, an Australian bus and coach manufacturing company
 BCI Engineers & Scientists, Inc., formerly Bromwell & Carrier, Inc.
 Better Cotton Initiative
 Bonobo Conservation Initiative
 British Columbia Investment Management Corporation
 Broadcasting Commission of Ireland
 Broward Correctional Institution, Florida, US
 Business Continuity Institute, UK

Banks
 Banco de Crédito e Inversiones, a Chilean bank
 Banca Commerciale Italiana, a defunct Italian bank
 Banco Comercial e de Investimentos, in the list of banks in Mozambique
 Bank of the Cook Islands

Education
Benedict XVI Catholic Institute, Negombo, Sri Lanka
 Bluevale Collegiate Institute, Ontario, Canada
 Brantford Collegiate Institute, Ontario, Canada
 Brockville Collegiate Institute, Ontario, Canada
 Bahria College Islamabad, Pakistan

Science
 Boa constrictor imperator
 Book Citation Index
 Brain–computer interface

Other
 Barro Colorado Island, in Panama Canal
 Black Crown Initiate
 Baoulé language, ISO-639-2 language code bci
 Barcaldine Airport, IATA airport code "BCI"

See also
 BCCI (disambiguation)